General Joseph Bridger (before 28 Apr  1631 – before 8 May 1686) was a military and political figure in the Colony of Virginia.  Some sources relate him as "Colonel" (Col.) Bridger.

Born in Gloucester, England, in 1631, he was the son of Samuel Bridger, the auditor of the College of Gloucester. Bridger served as a member of the Virginia House of Burgesses from Isle of Wight County, Virginia in the 1657-8 session, as well as in 1663. According to some sources, Bridger was later a co-acting Colonial Governor of Virginia in 1684, and 1685.

During Bacon's Rebellion, Bridger was an adherent of Governor William Berkeley.

Several of Bridger's descendants also served in the House of Burgesses.

He died in 1686, in Isle of Wight County, Virginia.  He was interred at St. Luke's Church, in Smithfield, Virginia.

Family 
Joseph Bridger married ca. 1654 Hester Pitt, daughter of Colonel Robert Pitt of Isle of Wight Co., Va.

The children of Joseph Bridger and Hester Pitt were:

 Capt. Joseph II (ca. 1654 - by 1713/4) who married Elizabeth Norsworthy
 Martha (ca. 1658 - 1714), married Thomas Godwin
 Col. Samuel (ca. 1663 - by 1713), married Elizabeth Godwin
 Col. William (ca. 1668 -1730), married Elizabeth Allen
 Elizabeth (ca. 1665 - 1717), married Thomas Lear
 Mary (ca 1667 - ), married Capt. Richard Tibboth
 Hester (1665 - ca. 1722), married George Williamson

See also

Among Governor Bridger's descendants were:

Jim Bridger, mountain man and explorer of the American Northwest
Robert Rufus Bridgers, North Carolina politician of the Civil War era
Bridger family of Virginia

References

External links
 https://bridgerfamilyassociation.wordpress.com/bridger-family-association/
 http://tk-jk.net/Bridgers/Shaggy/fog0000000027.html
 https://books.google.com/books/about/Seventeenth_Century_Isle_of_Wight_County.html?id=Z2AAvycdC94C

1631 births
1684 in the Thirteen Colonies
1685 in the Thirteen Colonies
1686 deaths
17th century in Virginia
17th-century Anglicans
English Anglicans
American Anglicans
Bridger family
Colonial American generals
Colonial governors of Virginia
House of Burgesses members
English emigrants
Military history of the Thirteen Colonies
People from Gloucester
People from Isle of Wight County, Virginia
Christians from Virginia